Ctenolepisma guadianicum is a species of silverfish in the family Lepismatidae. Like all silverfish, guadianicum prefers very humid environments, although some members of Thysanura have evolved minor adaptations to alter this. Guadianicum, similar to the vast majority of the near four hundred discovered silverfish, lives outdoors, under detritus, leaves, and other fallen forest debris. This silverfish is grey in appearance, less than an inch long,  with an oblong body shape. All members of Ctenolepisma have lengthy, angled antennae that extend from their head and reach towards their abdomen. Guadianicum also lacks wings, has three pairs of legs, and has abdomen appendages appearing similar to antennae. Unlike the indoor dwelling silverfish species, guadianicum is not considered a pest, however, this means that little else is known about this particular species discovered in the 1990s.

References

Further reading

 

Lepismatidae
Articles created by Qbugbot
Insects described in 1992